Lakshmi Vijayam is a 1948 Indian Tamil-language film directed by Bomman D. Irani. The film stars P. S. Govindan and Madhuri Devi.

Cast
The lists of cast and crew are adapted from the film credits.

Male cast
P. S. Govindan as Vikraman
C. V. V. Panthulu as Parakraman
Vidwan Srinivasan as Premanandar
G. M. Basheer as Meganathan
E. R. Sahadevan as King of Avandhi
K. R. Masilamani as Rajaguru
Ramanujam as Maha Vishnu
R. Devaraju as Minister
M. R. Saminathan as Pandian
M. V. Raju as Chakkamma's Father
K. K. Radha as Deaf Groom
T. R. Saminatha Pillai as Deaf Groom's Father

Female cast
Madhuri Devi as Amudha & Kumudha
M. R. Santhanalakshmi as Sasirekhai
R. Padma as Kanchana
M. M. Radha Bai as Queen of Avandhi
Radhamani as Mahalakshmi
K. T. Sakku Bai as Chakkamma
Kandhimathi as Friend
Ranganayagi as Friend
Kumari Ramani as Friend
Gandhimathi as Friend
Parijatham as Friend

Guest Artists
Kali Rathnam as Thoplan
M. E. Madhavan as Chulian
V. M. Ezhumalai as Appavi
Sriramulu as Prohit
P. S. Gnanam as Namudha

Crew
Director = Bomman D. Irani
Dialogues = D. V. Chari
Cinematography = G. Ranganathan
Audiography = M. Radhakrishnan
Editing = L. Balu
Art = M. V. Kochappu
Studio = Modern Theatres

Soundtrack
Music was composed by G. Ramanathan while the lyrics were penned by Sundara Vathiyar and Rajagopala Iyer.

References

External links

Indian drama films
Films scored by G. Ramanathan
1940s Tamil-language films
1948 drama films
1948 films
Indian black-and-white films